Greatest Hits is a compilation album by the English rock group Cardiacs, released on 2 April 2002.

The album's title may be ironic, as the extent to which Greatest Hits is a "greatest hits" album (in the usual sense of the phrase) is debatable. It contains only two single a-sides ("Manhoo" and "Odd Even"), features few tracks from the earlier part of the band's career, and does not feature many of their better-known songs (including their biggest hit, "Is This the Life?"). In some ways, it can be seen as a follow up to the 1995 compilation album Sampler, with an arbitrary track list chosen by the band.

Greatest Hits features one new and otherwise unavailable track, called "Faster Than Snakes With A Ball And A Chain". This is described as having been taken from the then-forthcoming and as-yet untitled album that was to follow Greatest Hits, the creation of which has evidently been abandoned by the band (not to be mistaken for LSD, a later album left in a similar incomplete state.)

Track listing

References

2002 greatest hits albums
Cardiacs compilation albums